Hanna Birgitta Kristina Wagenius (born 2 November 1988) is a Swedish blogger and politician. From 5 June 2011 to 26 June 2015 she was chairperson of the Centre Party Youth. She studied law at Uppsala University.

Wagenius was born at Flon in Härjedalen, Sweden.

References

External links
Hanna Wagenius' blog

1988 births
Living people
People from Härjedalen Municipality
Swedish bloggers
Centre Party (Sweden) politicians
21st-century Swedish women politicians
Swedish women bloggers
Uppsala University alumni